Zhengzhou No. 47 Middle School (郑州市 第四十七 中学 Zhèng-zhōu-shì dì-sì-shí-qī zhōng-xué) is one of the youngest and one of the most famous middle schools in Zhengzhou, the capital city of Henan Province, China.

Zhengzhou No. 47 Middle School was founded in 1996 when it had its first intake of junior middle school students only. In August 1997, it had its first intake of senior middle school students and became a middle school with both junior and senior students.

Zhengzhou No. 47 Middle School gained its fame in Zhengzhou City very fast since it was founded.

In 2002, the first batch of students who studied in both junior and senior middle schools in Zhengzhou No. 47 Middle School graduated. Among these students, one entered Beijing University, one Qinghua University and one University of Science and Technology of China. This was regarded as a huge success for the school.

External links
Official website of the School

High schools in Henan
Education in Zhengzhou
Educational institutions established in 1996
1996 establishments in China
Junior secondary schools in China